The Wushu and Kungfu competition at the 2009 Asian Martial Arts Games took place from 5 August to 8 August at the Silpa-archa Gymnasium, in Suphanburi Sports Center. Three events were cancelled due to lack of entries.

Medalists

Duilian

Men's sanda

Women's sanda

Medal table

Results

Duilian

Men's barehand
5 August

Men's weapons
5 August

Women's weapons
6 August

Men's sanda

52 kg

56 kg

60 kg

65 kg

Women's sanda

48 kg

52 kg

56 kg
6–8 August

60 kg
6–8 August

References
 Official website – Wushu Results

2009 Asian Martial Arts Games events
Asian Martial Arts Games
2009